In mathematics, a Weierstrass point  on a nonsingular algebraic curve  defined over the complex numbers is a point such that there are more functions on , with their poles restricted to  only, than would be predicted by the Riemann–Roch theorem. 

The concept is named after Karl Weierstrass.

Consider the vector spaces

 for 

Our knowledge of the sequence is therefore

There are  question marks here, so the cases  or  need no further discussion and do not give rise to Weierstrass points.

Assume therefore . There will be  steps up, and  steps where there is no increment. A non-Weierstrass point of  occurs whenever the increments are all as far to the right as possible: i.e. the sequence looks like

Any other case is a Weierstrass point. The gap sequence is

for a non-Weierstrass point. For a Weierstrass point it contains at least one higher number. (The Weierstrass gap theorem or Lückensatz is the statement that there must be  gaps.)

For hyperelliptic curves, for example, we may have a function  with a double pole at  only. Its powers have poles of order  and so on. Therefore, such a  has the gap sequence

In general if the gap sequence is

the weight of the Weierstrass point is

This is introduced because of a counting theorem: on a Riemann surface the sum of the weights of the Weierstrass points is 

For example, a hyperelliptic Weierstrass point, as above, has weight  Therefore, there are (at most)  of them.
The  ramification points of the ramified covering of degree two from a hyperelliptic curve to the projective line are all hyperelliptic Weierstrass points and these exhausts all the Weierstrass points on a hyperelliptic curve of genus .

Further information on the gaps comes from applying Clifford's theorem. Multiplication of functions gives the non-gaps a numerical semigroup structure, and an old question of Adolf Hurwitz asked for a characterization of the semigroups occurring. A new necessary condition was found by R.-O. Buchweitz in 1980 and he gave an example of a subsemigroup of the nonnegative integers with 16 gaps that does not occur as the semigroup of non-gaps at a point on a curve of genus 16 (see ). A definition of Weierstrass point for a nonsingular curve over a field of positive characteristic was given by F. K. Schmidt in 1939.

Positive characteristic 
More generally, for a nonsingular algebraic curve  defined over an algebraically closed field  of characteristic , the gap numbers for all but finitely many points is a fixed sequence  These points are called non-Weierstrass points.
All points of  whose gap sequence is different are called Weierstrass points.

If  then the curve is called a classical curve.
Otherwise, it is called non-classical. In characteristic zero, all curves are classical.

Hermitian curves are an example of non-classical curves. These are projective curves defined over finite field  by equation , where  is a prime power.

Notes

References

 
 

Algebraic curves
Riemann surfaces